Juan Manuel Gastélum Buenrostro (born 31 October 1954) is a Mexican politician affiliated with the PAN. He served in the Chamber of Deputies and the Congress of Baja California. He also served as the Municipal President of Tijuana.

References

1954 births
Living people
Politicians from Tijuana
Members of the Congress of Baja California
Members of the Chamber of Deputies (Mexico)
National Action Party (Mexico) politicians
21st-century Mexican politicians
Municipal presidents of Tijuana
Universidad de Sonora alumni
Deputies of the LXII Legislature of Mexico